Nhean Sosidan (born 11 October 2002) is a Cambodian footballer who plays as a midfielder for Tiffy Army of the C-League, and the Cambodia national team.

Club career
For the 2021 season, Sosidan began playing for the senior team of National Defense Ministry FC of the Cambodian C-League. That year he scored his first goal for the club on 14 July 2021 in a league match against Prey Veng FC after coming on as a 77th-minute substitute. That season he was called one of Cambodia's rising stars by Jose Rodriguez T. Senase of the Khmer Times.

International career
In late September 2021 Sosidan was named to Ryu Hirose's squad for two 2023 AFC Asian Cup qualification Play-off matches against Guam and for 2022 AFC U-23 Asian Cup qualification, both of which were scheduled for the following month. He went on to make his senior international debut on 12 October 2021 in the second-leg match against Guam, coming on as a second-half substitute for Lim Pisoth.

International career statistics

International goals

U23

References

2002 births
Living people
Association football forwards
Cambodian footballers
Cambodia international footballers
Competitors at the 2021 Southeast Asian Games
Southeast Asian Games competitors for Cambodia
21st-century Cambodian people